Fahad Al Kubaisi (born April 12, 1981) is a Qatari singer, record producer, human rights activist, and fashion model. His voice has been described as a "tender" baritone. He became successful in Arab Gulf states and Maghreb. He is also famous for producing a sophisticated genre of Khaliji music.

Early life

He was born in Doha and grew up in a devoted Muslim family. He is the second son among eight children (eight boys). He holds a bachelor's degree in physical education and sports science from Qatar University. In his childhood he was influenced by Arabic music, Khaliji music, and pop music .

Career

Islamic singing (1997–2005) 

He began his artistic career as an Islamic singer when he was in high school. He performed several Islamic songs solo in 1997 and in 2001 he released his first album Jamaal El Rouh (The Beauty of the Soul), and in 2005, when he was a university lecturer, he released his second album  Ela Rouhi (To my Soul).

Non-Islamic singing (2006–present)
He moved to the non-Islamic singing field with the help of Qatari composer Matar Ali al-Kuwari in 2006. In the same year he recorded his first non-Islamic album  Layesh (Why?), which was produced and distributed by Rotana. In 2008 he released his second non-Islamic album Asela (Questions), the first album produced and distributed by Platinum Records. In 2010 he released the third album Sah El Nawm which was produced and distributed by Platinum Records.

In 2012, Fahad's career jumped to a new level of success and popularity when he released his fourth album Tejy Neshaq, as his first album produced by himself. He worked on the music industry in collaboration with many musicians and poets, and ranked first in many countries including Qatar, Kuwait, Saudi Arabia and the United Arab Emirates.

Albums

Music videos

In 2014, Fahad filmed his solo song Wbadin in Turkey in the selfie way. cu music video has been very successful as selfie Video Clip is the first of its kind in the history of the Arabic music industry. Fahad held a selfie stick and started walking around the streets of Istanbul. In 2015, he released a single song Batalna (We finished) in the style of Arabic pop music; it is the first music video in the Middle East filmed in the 360-degree video way.

Soundtracks
 2011: Black Gold

References

How the Qatari singer Fahad Al Kubaisi struck oil -
'I Am Film' Video Portrait - Fahad Khaled Al Kubaisi
Fahad Al Kubaisi to take center stage at Shop Qatar’s opening ceremony

External links

 

1981 births
Living people
Qatari male singers
Dance musicians
World music musicians
Fifa World Cup ceremonies performers